Pool of Radiance: Ruins of Myth Drannor is a Forgotten Realms Dungeons & Dragons role-playing video game released in 2001 by Ubi Soft. It is the fifth and latest game in the Pool of Radiance series.

Gameplay
Ruins of Myth Drannor takes place from an isometric third-person perspective, similar to the Baldur's Gate series. Unlike Baldur's Gate and other Infinity Engine games, Ruins of Myth Drannor features turn-based combat rather than real-time combat. The game uses three-dimensional characters over pre-rendered two-dimensional backgrounds.

The game is a dungeon crawl, with a focus on hack and slash combat and the exploration of large dungeons. Story progression and interaction with other characters is a minimal part of the game, although there is some interaction with non-player characters (NPCs) and other in-game characters.

Plot

The story is set in the city of New Phlan. A dracolich and his sorcerer queen have seized control of the Mythal, the ancient magic that once protected the long abandoned elven city of Myth Drannor. Once the elven ruin is completely in their thrall, the cult intends to expand its domination one city—and one soul—at a time.

Four heroes are sent to Myth Drannor by Elminster to stop the dracolich and the sorcerer queen from using the power of the Mythal to conquer Faerûn. They must travel to all areas of Myth Drannor, including dungeons and catacombs beneath the city, in an attempt to stop evil from taking over the region.

Development
Producer Chuck Yager said the game was originally designed using the Advanced Dungeons & Dragons 2nd edition rules, but was converted to the 3rd edition rules partway through development. While Baldur's Gate II: Shadows of Amn implemented a few elements from the 3rd edition, Ruins of Myth Drannor was the first game attempting to comprehensively adapt those rules.

Reception

Sales
According to GameSpot's Desslock, Ruins of Myth Drannor "sold extremely well during its first few weeks, but bad word of mouth and reviews crippled future sales". He remarked that certain retailers had placed notes on their displays to warn customers about the title's bugs. In the United States, the game entered NPD Intelect's computer game sales chart at #1 for September 23–29, 2001. It held this position on the following week's chart, before falling to #9 in its third week of release. According to Ubisoft, the game surpassed 150,000 sales in its first 14 days. It finished 20th on NPD Intelect's chart for the month of September overall, and maintained this spot in October. By the first week of November, Ruins of Myth Drannor had sold 55,211 units in the United States.

Critical reviews

The game received lackluster reviews and was plagued with bugs. One major bug would cause a player's system files to uninstall when the game was removed. Other bugs included problems with installation, saving game files, graphics, and gameplay. Chris Chan of the New Straits Times complained that most of the game is spent "[engaged] with a lot of mindless battles and health and spell recuperation exercises."  Mark Meadows of The Wisconsin State Journal called the game: "A half-finished adaptation of D&D's new 3rd Edition rules that was rushed out the door despite being over a year late." GameSpy's review suggested: "If you see this game, walk away ... really fast!" Later patches fixed some of the stability issues. Branislav Babovic of mania.com commented: "Pool of Radiance: Ruins of Myth Drannor could simply be defined as a disk full of bugs, striving to be a slow Diablo based on AD&D third edition rules." Johnny Wilson Dragon for commented: "I like the way the new edition of the D&D rules have been integrated into the game [...] I'm thrilled with the emphasis on drow and undead, the villains we love to hate."

Adaptations
A novel based on the game, written by Carrie Bebris, was published by Wizards of the Coast and was also included with the collector's edition of the game, except in Europe. Despite much criticism of the game, opinions on the novel have generally been positive. The Collector's Edition version of the game contained a copy of the book, an original pen and paper module, an audio CD, and a bag of polyhedral dice. The printed adventure was called Pool of Radiance: Attack on Myth Drannor.

References

Further reading

External links

2001 video games
Forgotten Realms video games
Multiplayer and single-player video games
Role-playing video games
Stormfront Studios games
Tactical role-playing video games
Ubisoft games
Video games developed in the United States
Video games featuring protagonists of selectable gender
Windows-only games
Windows games
Video games about cults